The Chhaparband are a Muslim community found in the states of Karnataka and Maharashtra in India. They are Muslim converts from the Chhaparband community.

Muslim Chhapparband VJ DT 14

Origin
The Chhaparband are a community that were historically connected with thatching of roofs, an occupation no longer practiced. In Hindi, the word chhapar means roof and the Persian suffix band means binder and maker. They claim to have been Rajput soldiers in the armies of the Mughal Empire, as said to have originated from Kathiawar and Rajasthan. Their conversion to Islam is said to have occurred at the hands a Sufi saint Pir Bhai Phir Makhan. The Chhaparband speak the Dakhani dialect of Urdu, and are entirely Sunni Muslim. They are found mainly in north west Karnataka, mainly in the districts of Bijapur, Dharwad and Belgaum and the districts of Kolhapur and Sholapur in Maharashtra.

Present circumstances

The Chhaparband are largely a landless community, with many employed as agricultural labourers or urban daily wage labourers. Apart from this, a significant number are now employed as truck drivers, carpenters, masons, fruit sellers and shop owners. Like other Muslim communities in the Deccan, they have a caste association, the Chhaparband Jamat. Each of their settlement also has an informal communal association known as a panchayat, which acts as an instrument of social control.

The community is strictly endogamous, and marry close kin. They are divided into a number of clans, the main ones being the Bade bhai, Nane bhai, Cheghande and Baraghande. Each of these clans are of equal status, and intermarry.

References

Social groups of Maharashtra
Muslim communities of Maharashtra
Social groups of Karnataka
Muslim communities of Karnataka